Sisha Jumrha  is a census town in the Madarihat-Birpara CD block in the Alipurduar subdivision of the Alipurduar district  in the state of West Bengal, India.

Geography

Location

Area overview
Alipurduar district is covered by two maps. It is an extensive area in the eastern end of the Dooars in West Bengal. It is undulating country, largely forested, with numerous rivers flowing down from the outer ranges of the Himalayas in Bhutan. It is a predominantly rural area with 79.38% of the population living in the rural areas. The district has 1 municipal town and 20 census towns and that means that 20.62% of the population lives in urban areas. The scheduled castes and scheduled tribes, taken together, form more than half the population in all the six community development blocks in the district. There is a high concentration of tribal people (scheduled tribes) in the three northern blocks of the district.

Note: The map alongside presents some of the notable locations in the subdivision. All places marked in the map are linked in the larger full screen map.

Demographics
As per the 2011 Census of India, Sisha Jumrha had a total population of 4,130.  There were 2,116 (51%) males and 2,014 (49%) females. There were 537 persons in the age range of 0 to 6 years. The total number of literate people in Sisha Jumrha was 2,631 (73.23% of the population over 6 years).

Infrastructure
According to the District Census Handbook 2011, Jalpaiguri, Sisha-Jumrha covered an area of 4.2654 km2. Among the civic amenities, the protected water supply involved tap water from treated sources, tube well, bore well. It had 400 domestic electric connections, 1 road lighting point. Among the medical facilities it had 1 dispensary/ health centre, 1 charitable hospital/ nursing home, 1 medicine shop. Among the educational facilities it had 1 primary school, 1 middle school, the nearest secondary school at Dim Dim, the nearest senior secondary school, the nearest general degree college at Birpara 8 km away. It had 2 recognised shorthand, typewriting and vocational training institutions, 3 non-formal education centres (Sarva Siksha Abhiyan), 1 special school for disabled. Two important commodities it manufactured were paddy, furniture. It had offices of 1 nationalised bank, 1 private commercial bank, 1 non-agricultural credit society.

Healthcare
There is a primary health centre, with 6 beds, at Sisha Jumrha.

References

Cities and towns in Alipurduar district